Neri River is a river in southern Ethiopia. It is a tributary of the Mago River, which itself is a tributary of the Omo River.

See also
List of rivers of Ethiopia

Omo River (Ethiopia)
Rivers of Ethiopia